Coleophora iperspinata is a moth of the family Coleophoridae. It is found in Spain and France.

References

External links

iperspinata
Moths described in 2003
Moths of Europe